The 9th Magritte Awards ceremony, presented by the Académie André Delvaux, honored the best films of 2018 in Belgium and took place on 2 February 2019 at the Square in the historic site of Mont des Arts, Brussels, beginning at 8:00 p.m. CET. During the ceremony, the Académie André Delvaux presented Magritte Awards in 22 categories. The ceremony was televised in Belgium by La Deux. Directors Vincent Patar and Stéphane Aubier presided the ceremony, while comedian Alex Vizorek hosted the show for the first time.

The nominees for the 9th Magritte Awards were announced on 11 January 2019. Films with the most nominations were Above the Law and Girl with nine, followed by Let the Corpses Tan with eight, and The Benefit of the Doubt and Our Struggles with seven. The winners were announced during the awards ceremony on 2 February 2019. Our Struggles won five awards, including Best Film and Best Director for Guillaume Senez. Other multiple winners were Girl with four awards and Let the Corpses Tan with two.

Winners and nominees

Best Film
 Our Struggles (Nos batailles) Above the Law (Tueurs)
 Bitter Flowers
 Mon Ket
 Let the Corpses Tan (Laissez bronzer les cadavres)

Best Director
 Guillaume Senez – Our Struggles (Nos batailles) Hélène Cattet and Bruno Forzani – Let the Corpses Tan (Laissez bronzer les cadavres)
 Olivier Meys – Bitter Flowers
 François Troukens and Jean-François Hensgens – Above the Law (Tueurs)

Best Actor
 Victor Polster – Girl
 François Damiens –  Mon Ket Olivier Gourmet – Above the Law (Tueurs)
 Benoît Poelvoorde – Keep an Eye Out (Au poste!)

Best Actress
 Lubna Azabal – Above the Law (Tueurs) Cécile de France – Mademoiselle de Joncquières
 Yolande Moreau – I Feel Good
 Natacha Régnier – The Benefit of the Doubt (Une Part d'ombre)

Best Supporting Actor
 Arieh Worthalter – Girl Yoann Blanc – The Benefit of the Doubt (Une Part d'ombre)
 Bouli Lanners – Above the Law (Tueurs)
 Pierre Nisse – Let the Corpses Tan (Laissez bronzer les cadavres)

Best Supporting Actress
 Lucie Debay – Our Struggles (Nos batailles) Tania Garbarski – Bye Bye Germany (Es war einmal in Deutschland...)
 Salomé Richard – The Faithful Son (La Part sauvage)
 Erika Sainte – The Benefit of the Doubt (Une Part d'ombre)

Most Promising Actor
 Thomas Mustin – The Royal Exchange (L'Échange des princesses) Basile Grunberger – Our Struggles (Nos batailles)
 Baptiste Lalieu – The Benefit of the Doubt (Une Part d'ombre)
 Matteo Salamone – Mon Ket

Most Promising Actress
 Lena Girard Voss – Our Struggles (Nos batailles) Myriem Akheddiou – The Benefit of the Doubt (Une Part d'ombre)
 Bérénice Baoo – Above the Law (Tueurs)
 Nawell Madani – Stand Up Girl (C'est tout pour moi)
 Anaël Snoek – The Wild Boys (Les Garçons sauvages)

Best Screenplay
 Girl – Lukas Dhont and Angelo Tijssens Bitter Flowers – Olivier Meys and Maarten Loix
 Bye Bye Germany (Es war einmal in Deutschland...) – Sam Garbarski
 Our Struggles (Nos batailles) – Guillaume Senez

Best First Feature Film
 Bitter Flowers Above the Law (Tueurs)
 The Benefit of the Doubt (Une Part d'ombre)
 The Faithful Son (La Part sauvage)

Best Flemish Film
 Girl Angel (Un Ange)
 Don't Shoot (Niet Schieten)
 Gangsta (Patser)

Best Foreign Film in Coproduction
 The Man Who Killed Don Quixote The Death of Stalin
 The Happy Prince
 Nico, 1988

Best Cinematography
 Let the Corpses Tan (Laissez bronzer les cadavres) – Manuel Dacosse Above the Law (Tueurs) – Jean-François Hensgens
 Girl – Frank van den Eeden

Best Production Design
 Let the Corpses Tan (Laissez bronzer les cadavres) – Alina Santos Bye Bye Germany (Es war einmal in Deutschland...) – Véronique Sacrez
 Girl – Philippe Bertin

Best Costume Design
 Bye Bye Germany (Es war einmal in Deutschland...) – Nathalie Leborgne Girl – Catherine van Bree
 Let the Corpses Tan (Laissez bronzer les cadavres) – Jackye Fauconnier

Best Original Score
 When Arabs Danced – Simon Fransquet The Benefit of the Doubt (Une Part d'ombre) – Vincent Liben
 The Faithful Son (La Part sauvage) – Manuel Roland and Maarten Van Cauwenberghe

Best Sound
 Let the Corpses Tan (Laissez bronzer les cadavres) – Yves Bemelmans, Dan Bruylandt, Olivier Thys, Benoit Biral Above the Law (Tueurs) – Marc Engels, Thomas Gauder, Ingrid Simon
 Girl – Yanna Soentjens

Best Editing
 Our Struggles (Nos batailles) – Julie Brenta Girl – Alain Dessauvage
 Let the Corpses Tan (Laissez bronzer les cadavres) – Bernard Beets

Best Live Action Short Film
 Icarus (Icare) – Nicolas Boucart Calamity – Séverine De Streyker and Maxime Feyers
 Castle to Castle (D'un château l'autre) – Emmanuel Marre
 A Sister (Une Soeur) – Delphine Girard

Best Animated Short Film
 The Proposal (La Bague au doigt) – Gerlando Infuso Carnal Symbiosis (Simbiosis Carnal) – Rocío Álvarez
 The Horn Quartet (Le Quatuor à cornes) – Arnaud Demuynck and Benjamin Bottela
 Not Today – Marine Jacob

Best Documentary Film
 So Help Me God (Ni juge, ni soumise) – Jean Libon Cowboys and Indians: the Cinema of Patar and Aubier (Des Cowboys et des Indiens, le cinéma de Patar et Aubier) – Fabrice du Welz
 Holy Tour (La Grand-Messe) – Valéry Rosier and Méryl Fortunat-Rossi 
 Manu – Emmanuelle Bonmariage
 Mitra – Jorge León

Honorary Magritte Award
 Raoul Servais'Films with multiple nominations and awards

The following nine films received multiple nominations.
 Nine: Above the Law, Girl Eight: Let the Corpses Tan Seven: The Benefit of the Doubt, Our Struggles Four: Bitter Flowers, Bye Bye Germany Three: The Faithful Son, Mon KetThe following three films received multiple awards.
 Five: Our Struggles Four: Girl Three: Let the Corpses Tan''

See also

 44th César Awards
 24th Lumières Awards
 2018 in film

References

External links
 
 

2019
2018 film awards
2019 in Belgium